

Events
March 24 - The Handel and Haydn Society is founded as an oratorio society in Boston by a group of Boston merchants and musicians
Spanish classical guitarist Fernando Sor moves to London, England to try to garner some success there.
Summer – Gioachino Rossini goes to Naples as musical and artistic director of the Teatro San Carlo. His first opera for this theatre, Elisabetta, regina d'Inghilterra, premieres here on October 4.
December 25 – The Handel and Haydn Society, the oldest continuously performing arts organization in the United States, gives its first performance, at the King's Chapel in Boston.

Classical music
William Beale – "Come let us join the Roundelay"
Ludwig van Beethoven
Cello Sonatas Nos. 4 and 5, Op. 102.  Published in 1817.
25 Scottish Songs, Op. 108
Meeresstille und glückliche Fahrt, Op. 112, for chorus and orchestra
Zur Namensfeier overture, Op. 115
Leonore Prohaska, WoO 96
Es ist vollbracht, WoO 97
Die laute Klage, WoO 135
Des Krieger's Abschied, WoO 143
Das Geheimnis, WoO 145
12 Songs of Various Nationalities, WoO 157
Glück zum neuen Jahr, WoO 165
Kurz ist der Schmerz, und ewig ist die Freude, WoO 166
Leonhard von Call – 3 Guitar Sonatas, Op. 22
Matthew Camidge – 6 Concertos for Organ, Op. 13
Bartolommeo Campagnoli – Capricci, Op. 22
Luigi Cherubini – Symphony in D major
Carl Czerny – Variations brillantes, Op. 14
Friedrich Ernst Fesca – Psalm 103, Op. 26
Johann Nepomuk Hummel – Violin (or Flute) Sonata, Op. 64
Franz Krommer – Concerto No.2 for 2 Clarinets, Op. 91
Joseph Mayseder – String Quartet No.5, Op. 9
Giacomo Meyerbeer – Gli Amori di Teolinda (cantata)
Federico Moretti – "El amor y la amistad"
Anton Reicha 
Wind Quintet, Op. 91 No.1
Concerto for Clarinet and Orchestra in G minor
Ferdinand Ries 
The Dream, Op. 49
Piano Trio, Op. 63
Franz Schubert
Dozens and Dozens of Lieder, canons, and choruses, most notably: 
Mailied, D. 129, 199 and D. 202
Rastlose Liebe, D.138
An den Mond, D.193
Adelwold und Emma, D.211
Alles um Liebe, D.241
Die Bürgschaft, D.246
Heidenröslein, D.257
Erlkönig, D. 328
6 Lieder, Op. posth. 118 (D. 233, 234, 221, 248, 270, 247)
Totus in corde langueo, D.136
20 Waltzes, D.146
10 Variations in F major, D.156
Piano Sonata in E major, D. 157 (and excerpt Allegro in E major, D.154)
Mass No.2, D.167 and Mass No.3, D.324
String Quartet No.9, D.173
Stabat Mater, D.175
Adagio in G major, D.178
Minuet in A minor, D.277a
Piano Sonata No. 2, D.279
12 Ecossaises, D.299
Minuet in A major, D.334
12 Ländler, D.681
Liebe säuseln die Blätter, D.988
Louis Spohr – String Quartet No.8, Op. 29 No.2
Johann Wilhelm Wilms – Sonata for Piano Four Hands, Op. 41

Opera
Gioachino Rossini
Elisabetta, regina d'Inghilterra
Torvaldo e Dorliska
Franz Schubert 
Fernando, D.220
Claudine von Villa Bella, D.239
Die Freunde von Salamanka, D.326
Der Vierjahrige Posten

Births
January 22 – Ferdinand Praeger, composer, music teacher, pianist and writer (d. 1891)
March 8 – Jean Delphin Alard, composer and musician (died 1888)
March 11 – Anna Bochkoltz, German operatic soprano, voice teacher and composer (d. 1879)
April 6 – Robert Volkmann, composer (d. 1883)
April 12 – Henry Hugo Pierson, English composer (d. 1873)
May 10 – Anders Ljungqvist, fiddler (d. 1896)
June 28 – Robert Franz, composer (d. 1892)
July 30 – Herman Severin Løvenskiold, composer (d. 1870)
August 16 – Madame Céleste, dancer (d. 1882)
September 4 – Mihály Mosonyi, arranger and composer (died 1870)
September 17 – Halfdan Kjerulf, Norwegian composer (died 1868)
October 17 –  Emanuel Geibel, lyricist and playwright (died 1884)
November – Adelaide Kemble, opera singer (d. 1879)
December 25 – Temistocle Solera, opera composer and librettist (d. 1878)

Deaths
February 19 – Leonhard von Call, Austrian composer (born 1767)
March 4 – Frances Abington, singer and actress (born 1737)
April 8 – Jakub Jan Ryba, composer (born 1765) (suicide)
May 21 – Roman Hofstetter, composer (born 1742)
May 25 – Domenico Puccini, composer (born 1772)
June 22 – William Reeve, theatre composer (born 1757)
September 29 – Frederick Charles Reinhold, bass singer and organist (born 1737)
October 3 – Daniel Belknap, farmer, mechanic, militia captain, poet and singing teacher, one of the first American composers. (born 1771)
November 15 – Kaspar Anton Karl van Beethoven, brother of Ludwig van Beethoven (born 1774)
November 28 – Johann Peter Salomon, violinist, conductor, impresario and composer (born 1745)
December 14 – Charles Luke Lennox, heir to banking company, pianist (born 1800) (murder)
date unknown – Giovanni Bertati, librettist (born 1735)

References

 
19th century in music
Music by year